"Clubbin'" is the second single from Marques Houston's debut album, MH in the U.S. and his debut single in the UK. The song features Joe Budden and is the second track on the album.  The "Clubbin'" remix was also featured and once again Joe Budden performed on the track, alongside R. Kelly, credited as Pied Piper. R. Kelly also wrote and produced the song.

The single was Houston's biggest hit to date in both the UK and the U.S., peaking inside the UK top twenty at number fifteen and peaking inside the Billboard Hot 100 at number thirty-nine.

Music video 
The video contains Houston and Budden at a club with some females. The video featured Joe Budden and Tanee McCall, who had also appeared on Marques's first single, "That Girl". McCall was shown playing the guitar.

Track listing 
UK - CD

 "Clubbin'" (featuring Joe Budden & Pied Piper) (album version)
 "Clubbin'" (featuring Joe Budden) (remix)

UK - Vinyl

 "Clubbin'" (featuring Joe Budden & Pied Piper) (album version)
 "Clubbin'" (instrumental)
 "Clubbin'" (featuring Joe Budden) (remix)
 "Clubbin'" (remix instrumental)

Charts

Weekly charts

Year-end charts

References

2003 singles
Marques Houston songs
Songs written by R. Kelly
2003 songs
The Ultimate Group singles
Songs written by Joe Budden